The Nokia 5070 is a sibling of Nokia 6070 mobile phone made by Nokia. It operates on GSM tri band frequency 900, 1800 and 1900 MHz (850 and 1900 MHz in the US model), with automatic switching between frequencies. It is small in size with dimensions of 105,4 x 44,3 x 18,6 mm and weights 88 grams.

Key features 

 High-resolution color display with up to 65,536 colors (128 x 160 pixels)
 VGA (640*480 pixels) resolution camera with video capability 
 Multimedia messaging (MMS)
 GPRS and WAP 2.0 services
 EDGE (Enhanced Data rates for GSM Evolution) compatibility
 USB Connectivity (Pop-Port)
 Infrared
 Nokia Series 40 Theme compatibility
 FM radio (with headset)
 MP3 ringtones
 Address book, calendar, and reminders
 Java ME compatibility
 PTT (Push-To-Talk)
 xHTML web browser

The 5070 supports:
EDGE multislot class 6, max. 177,6 kbit/s
GPRS multislot class 10, max. 80 kbit/s

External links
Nokia Asia - Nokia 5070 

5070
Mobile phones introduced in 2007
Mobile phones with infrared transmitter